The Abyssocottinae are a subfamily of ray-finned fishes in the family Cottidae, the sculpins. They are known commonly as the deep-water sculpins. The entire family is endemic to Lake Baikal in Siberia.

Sculpins of this subfamily mostly live in deep water, below . There are 24 known species in seven genera.  These include, for instance, Abyssocottus korotneffi and Cottinella boulengeri which are among the deepest-living freshwater fish.  Baikal is the deepest lake on Earth and sculpins occupy even its greatest depths.

Evolution and systematics
Molecular studies based on mitochondrial DNA suggest that the Abyssocottinae along with other Lake Baikal cottoid fishes, now attributed to the likewise endemic Cottocomephorinae (Baikal sculpins) and Comephorinae (Baikal oilfish), together make a monophyletic group that has originated and diversified within the lake relative recently, since the Pliocene. The ancestors of this species flock comprising more than 30 species belonged to the widespread freshwater sculpin genus Cottus (in Cottidae). The Abyssocottidae itself appears as a natural group within this radiation, except that also the genus Batrachocottus should be included.

Genera
The following genera have been included in the subfamily:

References

 
Fish of Russia
Cottoidea